The Jaguar Vision Gran Turismo SV is a concept car designed, developed, and built by British manufacturer Jaguar as part of the Vision Gran Turismo project series in 2020. It was featured as a playable car in the Gran Turismo 7 video game.

References 

Gran Turismo (series)
Vision Gran Turismo SV